Barhead may refer to:

 Barhead, Ontario, a place in Canada
 Barhead spinefoot, or Siganus virgatus, a fish
 Barhead pipefish, a fish of genus Microphis

See also

 Bar-headed goose (Anser indicus)
 Barrhead (disambiguation)
 Head (disambiguation)
 Bar (disambiguation)